The Olympus 35 RD is a 35 mm rangefinder camera manufactured by Olympus in Japan in the 1970s.

Specification
 Lens: 40mm F. Zuiko f/1.7 6 elements
 Focus range: 0.85 meters (2.8 feet) to infinity
 Shutter-speed: B, 1/2, 1/4, 1/8 1/15, 1/30, 1/60, 1/125, 1/250, 1/500
 Aperture: 1.7, 2, 2.8, 4, 5.6, 8, 11, 16
 Exposure modes: metered shutter-preferred automatic exposure, unmetered-manual override and flashmatic modes.  When in automatic mode, the shutter will not fire if there is insufficient light.
 Filter size: 49mm
 Film speed scale: ASA 25–800
 Size: 11.4 cm × 7 cm × 5.7 cm (4½" × 2¾" × 2¼")
 Weight: 482 grams (17 oz)

See also
 List of Olympus products
 Olympus 35RC
 Olympus 35SP
 Olympus XA

External links
 https://www.flickr.com/groups/35rd/
 http://www.cameraquest.com/olyrd.htm
 http://www.ph.utexas.edu/~yue/misc/35RD.html

35RC